The De Dannan Collection is an album by Irish traditional music group De Dannan.  It is a 2003 version of their 1981 album "Star-Spangled Molly" with the tracks put into a different order, and two additional tracks ("The Teetotaler" set, and "Then You'll Remember Me").

Track listing 

 The Cuckoo's Nest Medley (instr) (Trad) 
 Come Back again To Me Mavourneen (Aylward) 
 New Irish Barn Dance (instr) (Trad) 
 Conlon's Jig/ Padraig O'Keefe's Head O' Cabbage/ Boys of Malin (instr) (De Danann/ De Dannan/ De Dannan/ De Dannan) 
 My Irish Molly-O (Schwartz and Jerome) 
 Hey Jude (instr) (J. Lennon & P. McCartney) 
 Maggie (James A. Butterfield and George W. Johnson) 
 Coleraine Jig/ Derraine's/ John Stenson's (instr) (Trad/ De Dannan/ Trad) 
 Kitty's Wedding/ The Rambler (instr) (Trad) 
 The Teetotaler/ St Anne's (instr) (Trad/ Trad) 
 Then You'll Remember Me (Unknown) 
 Morrison's/ The Tailor's Thimble/ Wellington's (instr) (Trad) 
 I'm Leaving Tipperary (?Pat White)

Running time 47 minutes 10 sec. No personnel named but Maura O'Connell sings "Maggie".

2003 albums
De Dannan albums